The following is a list of goalscorers in All-Ireland Senior Football Championship finals. See List of FIFA World Cup final goalscorers a similar list but in soccer not Gaelic football

Scoring in Gaelic games: Most scores are points but there are goals too.

The last final to finish goalless was in 2022. 

Dean Rock holds the record for the fastest goal scored in the history of All-Ireland SFC finals, after sending the ball past David Clarke directly from the throw-in of the 2020 final, breaking Kerryman Garry McMahon's record which had stood since the 1962 final.

Goalless finals
Complete list of goalless finals.

1895

1901

1903

1904

1906

1907

1910 (was not played)

1917

1918

1922

1924

1927

1952 replay

1964

1965

1969

1988 replay

1990

1992

2000 drawn game

2001

2003

2010

2015

2022

Finals goalscorers

Pre-1928

1928 to 1969: Introduction of the Sam Maguire Cup

1970 to 2000

2001 to present

Dean Rock 2020
Con O'Callaghan 2020
Cathal McShane 2021
Darren McCurry 2021

Men with multiple goals

They include (list probably not complete):

Tom O'Connor Kerry 3 1941, 1946 (drawn game), 1946 (replay)

William Guiry Dublin 2 1897

Joe Ledwidge Dublin 2 1897

Dick Fitzgerald Kerry 2 1913, 1915

Ned Sweeney Kerry 2 1929, 1930

Paul Russell Kerry 2 1931, 1932

John Joe Landers Kerry 2 1930, 1937 (replay)

Timmy O'Leary Kerry 2 1937 (replay)

Dan Spring Kerry 2 1939

Paddy Burke Kerry 2 1946 (drawn game), 1946 (replay)

References

Finals goalscorers
Gaelic football-related lists